Mehrnoush Najafi Ragheb (born 1979 in Hamedan) is an Iranian lawyer, Persian blogger, women's right activist and member of the city council of Hamedan (since Dec 2006).
She graduated in international law (M.A). She is organizer and chief of Human Rights Commission in  Hamedan Bar Association. She is also one of the active councillor in Iran who is protesting the destruction of the environment and antiquities and she writes in her weblog.
Nowadays she is one of the lawyers who takes a great effort to change discriminatory laws against women in Iran.

References

External links
https://web.archive.org/web/20110402031839/http://najafiragheb.ir/
http://hamedanbar.academia.edu/MehrnoushNajafiRagheb

Iranian bloggers
Iranian women bloggers
Iranian activists
Iranian women activists
Iranian women lawyers
Living people
Year of birth missing (living people)
21st-century Iranian lawyers